Fahhad Mohammed Al-Subaie (born 4 February 1994) is a Saudi athlete who specialises in the 200 metres. He won silver medals at the 2013 Asian Championships and 2014 Asian Games.

He has personal bests of 10.37 in the 100 metres (2013) and 20.74 seconds in the 200 metres (2013).

Competition record

1Did not start in the final

References

1994 births
Living people
Saudi Arabian male sprinters
Athletes (track and field) at the 2014 Asian Games
Asian Games medalists in athletics (track and field)
Asian Games silver medalists for Saudi Arabia
Medalists at the 2014 Asian Games
Islamic Solidarity Games competitors for Saudi Arabia
21st-century Saudi Arabian people